Nisbets is a British multi-channel retailer of catering equipment and supplies. It develops, retails and distributes commercial kitchen equipment, catering supplies and other hospitality products to hotels, restaurants, bars, cafes, schools and colleges.

Nisbets is Europe's largest supplier of catering equipment. It retails both own-brand goods, under labels such as Mitre Linen and Home Chef, and products from popular third-party brands. It retails products online, by mail-order and through a network of physical retail outlets.

Headquartered in Avonmouth, Bristol, Nisbets employs more than 2,000 people worldwide, and has offices in UK, Ireland, Belgium, Holland, Germany, France, Spain, Portugal and Australia. It exports to more than 100 countries, and was awarded The Queen's Award for Enterprise for International Trade in 2017.

History

1983-2000: Founding of Nisbets 
Nisbets was founded by Andrew Nisbet in 1983. It started out selling knives, catering clothing and textbooks to catering colleges, building on the business of Nisbet’s father, Peter Nisbet, which provided catering kits to colleges in South West England.

In 1987, the company launched its first mail-order catalogue, selling products to students and trade customers. Catering Insight called the mail order catalogue the "bedrock of the company”.

Nisbets acquired catering wholesaler Red Ball in 1990, which was rebranded as RB Distributors, and enabled the company to start wholesaling to shops and other retailers for the first time.

By 1995, the company stocked 8,000 products for next-day delivery. The business opened its first non-UK office in 1996 in Cork, Republic of Ireland.

2000-2010: International expansion in Europe 
In 2000, Nisbets opened an office in the Netherlands, the company's first physical presence outside of the British Isles. The new office was responsible for mail-order sales of Nisbet products in Holland and Belgium.

Nisbets opened further offices in France in 2005 and Spain in 2007. The company also opened dedicated offices in Germany, Belgium and Portugal. Due to growing demand, the company relocated to new larger premises in Avonmouth, Bristol, in 2004, and subsequently moved to a larger 165,000 sq. ft. unit in 2008.

In 2010, Nisbets acquired Pages, a catering retail outlet on Shaftesbury Avenue, London. The site was the company's first retail shop, and the company said they viewed high-street retail as the "perfect opportunity to attract serious home cooks as well as catering to trade customers."

2010-2017: High street growth and Australia expansion 
In 2010, Nisbets acquired established Australian catering retailer Caterers Warehouse, which already operated retail sites in Erina, New South Wales and Castle Hill, New South Wales. Further retail stores were opened across the country in New South Wales, Victoria, Australian Capital Territory and Queensland over the next 7 years. As of December 2017, Nisbets has 12 retail outlets in Australia.

Nisbets opened a new distribution centre in Campbelltown, New South Wales in 2015 to support growth of the business.

Between 2010 and 2017, Nisbets opened 29 physical stores across the UK, focusing on major cities and towns, including Birmingham, Manchester, Cardiff, Edinburgh and Belfast. As a result of growth, Nisbets was listed in The Sunday Times Top Track 250. In 2017, the company was listed as the 58th fastest growing company in the UK.

In 2016, Nisbets acquired microwave distributor Bradshaw Microwave and linen manufacturer Mitre Linen, which has held a Royal Warrant to supply the royal household since 1955. Nisbets also acquired a stake in commercial fit out and restaurant furniture manufacturer Space Group. In 2017, Nisbets acquired Choice Catering Equipment in New Zealand to expand its services in the country.

In 2017, Nisbets reported sales of £328 million, and was awarded The Queen's Award for Enterprise in International Trade.

Products and services 
Nisbets retails more than 25,000 product lines, including both own-brand goods and third-party products and equipment. It retails products for the foodservice and catering supply chain, including food preparation, restaurant furniture and fast-food order and delivery.

Its products include crockery, glassware, tableware, knifewear, kitchen clothing and footwear, restaurant furniture, kitchen equipment, chemical cleaning products, refrigeration and freezing units, catering appliances, and consumables.

The company also develops, manufactures and retails kitchen supplies and products under its own brands. Nisbets owns Gastronoble, Bradshaw Microwave, Mitre Linen, Jantex and Home Chef.

Nisbets retails to wholesalers, businesses and the public. In 2012, the company called itself a "next-day business", providing next-day delivery on any orders received before 8pm. Nisbets also operates financing service Chef Leasing.

Operations 
Headquartered in Avonmouth, Bristol, Nisbets retails its products online and by mail-order. The company also operates a network of retail stores, but physical outlets are a smaller part of the overall business. In April 2018, Nisbets opened its 31st retail outlet in the UK. As of January 2018, Nisbets operates 11 retail outlets in Australia, and one retail outlet in the Republic of Ireland.

Nisbets’ main European distribution centre is in Avonmouth, Bristol, UK. In January 2016, the company opened a new 145,000 sq ft distribution centre in Doncaster. The company said that it would enable it to reduce its cut off time for orders from customers in the North for next-day delivery. The company also operates distribution centres in Cork, Ireland; Campbelltown, New South Wales, Australia; and Valencia, Spain.

References

Catering and food service companies of the United Kingdom
Mail-order retailers
Companies based in Bristol